Ingrīda Circene (born 6 December 1956 in Rīga) is a Latvian politician, who served as the Minister for Health of Latvia. She is a member of Unity.

Ingrīda Circene has been member of the Council of Aizpute. In 2002 she joined New Era Party and became a member of the 8th Saeima. After the resignation of Āris Auders, Circene became the Minister for Health of Latvia on 10 April 2003, being in office until government resignation on 9 March 2004. In 2006 and 2010 she became a member of respectively the 9th and 10th Saeima. Circene was appointed Minister for Health of Latvia on 25 October 2011.

References

External links
 Cabinet profile

1956 births
Living people
Politicians from Riga
New Era Party politicians
New Unity politicians
21st-century Latvian women politicians
Ministers of Health of Latvia
Deputies of the 8th Saeima
Deputies of the 9th Saeima
Deputies of the 10th Saeima
Women government ministers of Latvia
Riga Stradiņš University alumni
Women deputies of the Saeima